UNStudio (formerly Van Berkel en Bos Architectenbureau) is a Dutch architectural practice specializing in architecture, urban development and "infrastructural" projects. The practice was founded in 1988 by Ben van Berkel and Caroline Bos. The initials "UN" stand for United Network, a reference to the collaborative nature of the practice comprising individuals from various countries with backgrounds and technical training in numerous fields. In 2009 UNStudio Asia was established, with its first offices located in Shanghai and Hong Kong. UNStudio Asia is a full service office with a multinational team of all-round and specialist architects and is intricately connected to UNStudio Amsterdam. Further offices are located in Frankfurt, Dubai and Melbourne.  UNStudio has an average work-force of 250+ employees and a management team made up of two co-founders and three partners, Astrid Piber, Gerard Loozekoot and Hannes Pfau.

Work 
Based in Amsterdam, UNStudio has worked internationally since its inception and has produced a wide range of work ranging from public buildings, infrastructure, offices, living, products, to urban masterplans.

UNStudio projects include:
 The office complex for the Education executive Agency and Tax Office in Groningen, Netherlands (under construction in 2011)
 Erasmus Bridge, Rotterdam (1990–1996)
 Electricity substation Amersfoort, Netherlands (1994)
 The office complex La Defense, Almere (1999–2004)
 The Möbius House, Gooi region (1993–1998)
 Electricity substation in Innsbruck, Austria (2002)
 The new Mercedes-Benz Museum in Stuttgart (2001–2006)
 Theatre Agora in Lelystad (2002–2007)
 VilLA NM, Sullivan County, New York, destroyed by fire in 2008
 Five Franklin Place, New York City
 MYchair for Walter Knoll
 Star Place luxury shopping plaza in Kaohsiung, Taiwan
 Music Theatre (MUMUTH) in Graz, Austria
 Burnham Pavilion, Chicago
 David the Builder Kutaisi International Airport, Kutaisi, Georgia
 Arnhem Centraal station, Netherlands (1996-2015)
 18 Septemberplein Renovation, The Netherlands
 Doha Metro Network Stations, Qatar
 Eclipse, Düsseldorf, Germany (in collaboration with HPP Architekten)
 Echo building of Delft University of Technology, Delft, the Netherlands (2022)

Former staff architects
 Australian Institute of Architects award-winning architect Andrew Benn

Awards
World Winners Prix Versailles 2018

Projects gallery

References 
 Falk Jaeger: "UNSTUDIO", JOVIS Verlag Berlin 2009,

External links 

 UNStudio Homepage
 UNStudio publications on Archello
 Baunetz Crystal Talks series. Interview Ben van Berkel 2009
 Interview with Ben van Berkel in The Leaf Review, January 2008
 Interview with Ben van Berkel on The T-Machine
 Interview with Ben van Berkel about What is architecture?, 2014
 Designboom interview
 ARCspace
 UNStudio Projects
 UNStudio on Architecture News Plus

Architecture firms of the Netherlands